Tielve is one of nine parishes (administrative divisions)  in Cabrales, a municipality within the province and autonomous community of Asturias, in northern Spain. 

The postal code is 33554. The parish has one village.

References  

Parishes in Cabrales